Divorzio a Las Vegas is a 2020 Italian comedy film directed by Umberto Carteni.

Distribution 
The film was released by 01 Distribution in cinemas from 8 October 2020.

Cast
Giampaolo Morelli as Lorenzo
Andrea Delogu as Elena
Ricky Memphis as Lucio
Grazia Schiavo as Sara
Gianmarco Tognazzi as Giannandrea
Luca Vecchi as Tullio
Desirée Popper as Silvia
Vincent Riotta

References

External links

2020 films
Films directed by Umberto Carteni
Films set in the Las Vegas Valley
Italian comedy films
2020s Italian-language films
2020 comedy films
2020s Italian films